Independence Middle School may refer to:

Independence Middle School (Jupiter, Florida)
Independence Middle School (Independence, Ohio)